This is a list of drama films of the 1980s.

1980
 Altered States
 The Blue Lagoon
 Breaker Morant
 Coal Miner's Daughter
 The Elephant Man
 Germany Pale Mother
 The Great Santini
 Honeysuckle Rose
 Kagemusha
 The Last Metro
 Ordinary People
 Playing for Time
 Raging Bull
 The Resurrection
 Urban Cowboy
 Who's That Singing Over There
 Zigeunerweisen

1981
 Absence of Malice
 Adaptatziya
 Atlantic City
 Die Berührte
 Chariots of Fire
 The Circle of Deceit
 Endless Love
 Lola
 Man of Iron
 Marianne and Juliane
 Masada
 Mephisto
 Mommie Dearest
 On Golden Pond
 Pixote
 Le Pont du Nord
 The Postman Always Rings Twice
 Prince of the City
 Ragtime
 Skokie
 Smash Palace
 Three Brothers
 The Wave
 Zigeunerweisen

1982
 The Angel
 Another Way
 Boat People
 Fanny and Alexander
 First Blood
 The Grey Fox
 Macbeth
 Little Gloria... Happy at Last
 Missing
 Moonlighting
 Napló gyermekeimnek
 The Night of the Shooting Stars
 Przesluchanie
 A Question of Silence
 Sophie's Choice
 That Night in Varennes
 The Verdict
 Veronika Voss
 Wend Kuuni
 The Year of Living Dangerously
 Yol

1983
 10 to Midnight
 À nos amours
 L'Argent
 The Ballad of Narayama
 Betrayal
 Entre Nous
 Makioka Sisters
 Le Mur
 My Brother's Wedding
 El Norte
 One Deadly Summer
 The Right Stuff
 Scarface
 Sheer Madness
 Silkwood
 Sweet Bunch
 Tender Mercies
 Terms of Endearment
 Testament
 WarGames

1984
 Amadeus
 Annie's Coming Out
 The Element of Crime
 Flügel und Fesseln
 The Home and the World
 The Killing Fields
 Klassenverhältnisse
 Macross: Do You Remember Love?
 Moi Drug Ivan Lapshin
 Nineteen Eighty-Four
 Once Upon a Time in America
 Paris, Texas
 A Passage to India
 Places in the Heart
 The Razor's Edge
 Secret Honor
 A Soldier's Story
 A Sunday in the Country
 Threads
 The Year of the Quiet Sun
 Yellow Earth

1985
 Adiós, Roberto
 The Color Purple
 Kiss of the Spider Woman
 Ladyhawke
 The Legend of Suram Fortress
 Man Hunt
 Ran
 Witness

1986
 Blood & Orchids (TV)
 Children of a Lesser God
 Jean de Florette
 Loyalties
 Ménage
 Mona Lisa
 A Promise
 A Room with a View
 Round Midnight
 Salvador
 Shadows in Paradise
 Stand by Me
 Tras el cristal

1987
 84 Charing Cross Road
 Babette's Feast
 Bagdad Café
 Business as Usual
 Morning Patrol
 Nayakan

1988
 1969
 A Dos Aguas
 A sega nakade?
 The Accidental Tourist
 The Accused
 Action Jackson
 Ariel
 Ashik Kerib
 The Attic: The Hiding of Anne Frank
 Celia
 Cinema Paradiso
 Dangerous Liaisons
 Dead Ringers
 Fun Down There
 Grave of the Fireflies
 The Land Before Time
 Mississippi Burning
 Open from 18 to 24
 Pelle the Conqueror
 Rain Man
 Salaam Bombay!
 Story of Women
 The Unbearable Lightness of Being

1989
 Black Rain
 City of Sadness
 Dead Poets Society
 Do the Right Thing
 Drugstore Cowboy
 Field of Dreams
 Monsieur Hire
 Piravi
 Sex, Lies, and Videotape

References

Drama
1980s